A telephone hook or switchhook is an electrical switch which indicates when the phone is hung up, often with a lever or magnetic button inside the cradle or base where a telephone handset resides.  It takes its name from old wooden wall telephones and candlestick telephones, where the mouthpiece was mounted on the telephone box and, due to sidetone considerations, the receiver was separate, on a cable.  When the telephone was not in use, the receiver was hung on a spring-loaded hook; its weight would cause the hook to swing down and open an electrical contact, disconnecting something, but not the telephone from the line or the phone could not ring.  When the handset is on the cradle, the telephone is said to be "on-hook", or ready for a call.  When the handset is off the cradle, the telephone is said to be "off-hook", or unable to receive any (further) calls.

Pushing the switchhook quickly is termed a "hook flash".

Purpose
Telephone switchhook separates calling and transmitting circuits of the telephone and closes the battery circuit of transmitter to avoid a waste of battery energy. Before an invention of the switchhook the user had to manually turn the switch. Some users found that task too difficult, some forgot to turn the switch.

Invention
Several people claimed to be the first inventors of the switchhook (such as Thomas A. Watson), but Hilborne Roosevelt managed to get recognition and royalties for his invention. The son of Edwin Holmes claimed to use that device long before their patents.

See also
 Off the Hook – A radio show 
 Permanent signal

References

Telephony equipment
Telephony signals